Yury Nikolayevich  Chernov (born 24 April 1949) is a Soviet and Russian  actor of theatre and cinema. Honored Artist of Russia   (1994) and People's Artist of Russia (2008).

Biography 
Yuri was born April 24, 1949 in the city of Kuibyshev. Graduated from the Moscow Circus School and GITIS.

Appeared in films since 1968 - in the film   We'll Live Till Monday  played high school students Syromyatnikov.

In 1969 he was already approved by the director  Vladimir Motyl on the role Petrukha who later became a very popular Soviet action movie White Sun of the Desert , but Yuri chose the circus.

Played in the Moscow Theater of Miniatures, and since 1994 at the Theater of the Moon. Since 2004 - an actor of theater  School of Modern Drama.

From 1995 to 2000 he was a co-host of a game show Wheel of History.

In 1999, together with other well-known artists participated in the project Victor Merezhko and composer Yevgeny Bednenko  Sing the stars of theater and cinema , where successfully performed as a singer of songs. The project resulted in concerts and music CD, released in the United States and dubbed  Radio MPS.

In addition to film, he acted in the comic newsreels Fitil and  Yeralash and was one of the hosts of the popular children's television program Spokoynoy nochi, malyshi!.

He works actively for the Society of the Disabled and is engaged in publishing. Teaches at the Institute of Folk Art (guitar, harmonica, vocals).

Since 2013, he is an actor at the Theater of Satire.

Personal life
Chernov is married and has two children.

Selected filmography
 We'll Live Till Monday (1968)
 Village Detective (1969)
 In the Zone of Special Attention (1978)
 The Adventures of the Elektronic (1979)
 Along Unknown Paths (1982)
 After the Rain, on Thursday (1985)
 What a Mess! (1995)

References

External links

    Interview Teatron Magazine 
  Filmography Yuri Chernov

1949 births
Living people
Actors from Samara, Russia
Male actors from Moscow
Soviet male film actors
Soviet male television actors
Soviet male stage actors
Russian male film actors
Russian male television actors
Russian male stage actors
Honored Artists of the Russian Federation
People's Artists of Russia
Russian Academy of Theatre Arts alumni